This is a list of people to manage Livingston F.C. since their change from Meadowbank Thistle in 1995.

The club have had 15 permanent managers with Jim Leishman the only person to manage the club twice.

Managers

Caretaker managers

References

Managers
 
Livingston
Managers